Emma Swanson (born 27 February 1995) is an Australian rules footballer and the captain of the West Coast Eagles in the AFL Women's competition.

Amateur career
Swanson is originally from Mandurah, Western Australia. She has played state league football for the Peel Thunderbirds and East Fremantle in the West Australian Women's Football League (WAWFL).

From 2013 to 2015, Swanson represented  in AFL sanctioned women's exhibition matches. In the 2016 series, she played for the  representative side.

AFL Women's career
Swanson was signed as a marquee player by Greater Western Sydney in July 2016, ahead of the league's inaugural 2017 season. She injured her hamstring in the week leading up to round one, and consequently did not make her debut until round three. Nonetheless, Swanson was listed in the 2017 All-Australian squad.

Greater Western Sydney signed Swanson for the 2018 season during the trade period in May 2017.

Expansion club West Coast signed Swanson for their inaugural season in 2020. It was revealed Swanson had signed on with the club for two more years on 28 June 2021, tying her to the Eagles until the end of the 2022/2023 season.

Statistics
 Statistics are correct to the end of the 2017 season

|- style="background-color: #EAEAEA"
! scope="row" style="text-align:center" | 2017
|
| 17 || 5 || 0 || 1 || 52 || 28 || 80 || 13 || 14 || 0.2 || 0.0 || 10.4 || 5.6 || 16.0 || 2.6 || 2.8
|- class="sortbottom"
! colspan=3| Career
! 5
! 0
! 1
! 52
! 28
! 80
! 13
! 14
! 0.0
! 0.2
! 10.4
! 5.6
! 16.0
! 2.6
! 2.8
|}

Other work
Outside of football, Swanson works as a Firefighter in WA. She completed her training in December 2020 and was recognised as Dux of her graduating class.

Swanson is a passionate home improver and is passionate about her small hobby farm, extended hospitality decking and lawn.

Emma Swanson was kicked off her own AFLW podcast, the Inside Swoop, by former co-host and teammate Parris Laurie. Laurie welcomed Swanson back to the studio with a peace offering, sharing their biggest episode of the year with AFLW superstar and mother of the year, Dana Hooker.

References

External links

Greater Western Sydney Giants (AFLW) players
Living people
1995 births
Australian rules footballers from Western Australia
Sportswomen from Western Australia
People from Mandurah
West Coast Eagles (AFLW) players
Lesbian sportswomen
Australian LGBT sportspeople
LGBT players of Australian rules football